, sometimes shortened to Ohta Pro, is a Japanese talent agency headquartered in Yotsuya, Shinjuku, Tokyo. The agency have produced numerous television personalities in the entertainment industry.

Notable talents

Comedians
Aka Plu
Alco and Peace (Kenta Sakai, Yuki Hirako)
Hiroiki Ariyoshi
Dacho Club (Katsuhiro Higo, Jimon Terakado, Ryuhei Ueshima)
Gekidan Hitori
Kannazuki
Kunihiro Matsumura
Miyashita Kusanagi (Koki Kusanagi, Kensho Miyashita)
Time Machine 3go (Koji Yamamoto, Futoshi Seki)
Teruyuki Tsuchida
Kanako Yanagihara

Actors
Emiri Henmi
Tsurutaro Kataoka
Naoki Kunishima
Tatsuya Nōmi
Keiko Saito
Mai Sekiguchi
Gaku Shindo
Reiko Takashima
Takeshi Tsuruno
Kohei Yamamoto

Idols
Anna Iriyama (former AKB48)
Erika Ikuta (former Nogizaka46)
Rie Kitahara (former NGT48 + AKB48)
Rika Nakai (NGT48)
Kayo Noro (former AKB48 + SDN48)
Yuko Oshima (former AKB48)
Rino Sashihara (former HKT48 + AKB48)
Yui Yokoyama (former AKB48)

Athletes
Yoko Gushiken (former boxer)
Takanori Hatakeyama (former boxer)
Toshiaki Kawada (former wrestler)
Shinji Takehara (former boxer)
Katsuo Tokashiki (former boxer)

Other tarento
Shinnosuke Furumoto (voice actor)
Kansai Yamamoto (fashion designer)

Notable former talents
Bakushō Mondai (Yuji Tanaka, Hikari Ōta) (comedy duo)
Egashira 2:50 (comedian)
Kenji Haga (actor, businessman)
Toshihito Ito (actor)
Carolyn Kawasaki (model)
Naomi Kawashima (actress)
Hiroko Kurumizawa (singer)
Neptune (Taizo Harada, Ken Horiuchi, Jun Nagura) (comedy trio)
Mari Okamoto (comedian)
Bibiru Ōki (comedian)
Erena Ono (former AKB48)
Shun Sugata (actor)
Beat Takeshi (comedian, actor, director) - and all others from Office Kitano
Atsuko Maeda (former AKB48)

References

External links 
 Official website

Talent agencies based in Tokyo
Mass media companies established in 1963
Mass media companies based in Tokyo
Japanese companies established in 1963
Japanese talent agencies